Nick Jr. is a Dutch pay-TV preschooler's network and is part of the Dutch Nickelodeon network. After the transition of Kindernet to Nickelodeon in 2003, Nick Jr. became a programme block on Nickelodeon in the morning. Nick Jr. was to launch as a separate channel on 1 January 2005, but due to some capacity issues, it finally launched a few months later on 1 May.

Programming
 Abby Hatcher
 The Backyardigans
 Ben & Holly's Little Kingdom
 Blaze and the Monster Machines
 Blue's Clues
 Blue's Clues & You!
 Boohbah
 Bruno and the Banana Bunch
 Bubble Guppies
 Butterbean's Café
 Clifford the Big Red Dog
 Dirk Scheele
 Domo
 Dora and Friends: Into the City!
 Dora the Explorer
 Deer Squad
 Fifi and the Flowertots
 Go, Diego, Go!
 Jellabies
 Little Bill
 Little Charmers
 Little Red Tractor
 Little People
 Louie
 Lunar Jim
 Maisy
 Make Way for Noddy
 Max & Ruby
 Miss Spider's Sunny Patch Friends
 Mr. Men and Little Miss
 Ni Hao, Kai-lan
 Oswald
 PAW Patrol
 Paz
 Peppa Pig
 Picme
 Pim & Pom
 Postman Pat
 Roary the Racing Car
 Rolie Polie Olie
 Rubbadubbers
 Rupert Bear, Follow the Magic...
 Shaun the Sheep
 Shimmer and Shine
 Santiago of the Seas
 Team Umizoomi
 Thomas and Friends
 Timmy Time
 Wallykazam!
 Wanda and the Alien
 The Wonder Pets
 Zack & Quack

References

External links
 Official Website

Television channels in the Netherlands
Television channels in Flanders
Television channels in Belgium
Netherlands
Children's television networks
Television channels and stations established in 2005
2005 establishments in the Netherlands